Everette "Rhett" Maddox (1944–1989) was an American poet who in 1979 co-founded (with Robert Stock and sculptor Franz Heldner) the longest-running poetry-reading series in the South at the Maple Leaf Bar in New Orleans, Louisiana.

Biography
Maddox was born near Prattville, Alabama. He studied at the University of Alabama, where he did his doctoral work but did not graduate.

He moved to New Orleans and taught at Xavier University beginning in 1975, before losing that position and, later, becoming homeless. In 1975 he became an associate editor for Louis Gallo's Burataria Review, and then started organizing and MCing at the Maple Leaf Bar. He died of esophageal cancer in 1989.

His work was published in The New Yorker and The Paris Review. He published two books of poetry, and another was published posthumously. Other poetry was included in Umpteen Ways of Looking at a Possum: Critical and Creative Responses to Everette Maddox, edited by Grace Bauer and Julie Kane. In 2009 another selection of his poetry was published, I Hope Its Not Over And Goodby: Selected Poems of Everette Maddox.

His ashes are buried in the patio behind the Maple Leaf Bar under a stone that reads: "Everette Maddox – He was a mess."

Bibliography
The Everette Maddox Songbook
Bar Scotch
American Waste
I Hope Its Not Over And Goodby: Selected Poems of Everette Maddox (2009)

Poetry and criticism

References

External links
 Everette Maddox Papers at The Historic New Orleans Collection

American male poets
1944 births
1989 deaths
University of Alabama alumni
Xavier University faculty
Writers from Montgomery, Alabama
20th-century American poets
20th-century American male writers